Gilet is both a given name and a surname. Notable people with the name include:

 Don Gilet (born 1967), British actor
 Gilet Velut (fl. early 15th century), French composer
 Gilét Smaragd (fl. 1258–1266), Hungarian noble of French origin

See also
 Giler
 Giles (surname)